This is a list of Punjabi films released in the Indian Punjab after 2011.

2019

2018

2017

2016

2015

Roshan prince

2014

2013

2012

2011

See also
List of highest-grossing Punjabi films
List of Indian Punjabi films between 2001 and 2010
List of Indian Punjabi films between 1991 and 2000
List of Indian Punjabi films between 1981 and 1990
List of Indian Punjabi films between 1971 and 1980
List of Indian Punjabi films before 1970
List of Pakistani Punjabi films

References

Cinema of Punjab
Punjabi 2011
Punj